Malia Vaka (née Paseka; born 23 September 1994) is a New Zealand netball player.

Paseka was born in New Zealand but played junior netball in Australia.

Paseka was a member of the New Zealand national netball team at the 2015 Netball World Cup.

She announced her pregnancy on 11 June, and that she would not play in the 2016 ANZ Championship.

References

1994 births
Living people
New Zealand netball players
Northern Stars players
Waikato Bay of Plenty Magic players
Northern Mystics players
Mainland Tactix players
2015 Netball World Cup players
New Zealand international Fast5 players
New Zealand international netball players